Prickly ash may refer to:
 Aralia spinosa, a plant native to eastern North America
 Orites excelsus, a plant native to Australia
 Zanthoxylum, the genus containing Sichuan pepper (花椒) and the American Midwest invasive species
 Papilio pelaus, the prickly ash swallowtail butterfly